Jeeja Ghosh is an Indian disability rights activist. She was born with cerebral palsy.

Early life and education
She completed her schools from the Indian Institute of Cerebral Palsy and La Martiniere for Girls, Kolkata (Calcutta), India. She graduated with Honours in Sociology from Presidency College in Kolkata. She is a qualified social worker (MSW) from the Delhi School of Social Work, Delhi University. In 2006 she completed her second masters in Disability Studies from Leeds University, United Kingdom.

Career
Ghosh has been involved in the social sector for more than two decades. She believes in the rights-based approach and dignity of all human beings. She has been a part of the disabled people's movement and is connected to other disability rights activists across India. Her special interest is women with disabilities.

Ghosh conducted workshops and presented papers in various seminars and conferences in both national and international forums like International Society for Augmentative and Alternative Communication (ISAAC), British Council etc. She has been felicitated by the West Bengal Commission for Women on the International Women's Day. She received the Shri N.D. Diwan Memorial Award for Outstanding Professional Services in Rehabilitation of Persons with Disabilities by the National Society for Equal Opportunities of the Handicapped (NASEOH), Mumbai. She received the Role Model Award from the Office of the Disability Commissioner, Government of West Bengal.  She has been felicitated by the Telegraph, Friends FM and other groups.  She is the main protagonist of landmark judgement (Jeeja Ghosh & anr. Vs SpiceJet & ors.) of the Supreme Court of India for equal rights of persons with disabilities.

Ghosh's interests also lie in writing and creative arts. She has a passion for writing poetry. Recently she acted as a lead supporting character in a film called One Little Finger: Ability in Disability directed by Rupam Sarmah. The film is now in post-production stage. She is also a part of an inclusive theatre group Katha Kalam and is a part of their production Black Hole are Not Black, are play based on the Nirbhaya incident.

A documentary film named I Am Jeeja has been made upon her life produced by PSBT & Doordarshan of India and directed by Swati Chakraborti.
The film I'm Jeeja won the National Film Award 2016 from the Govt. of India as the best film for social issues in the non-feature film category.

She now works for the Indian Institute of Cerebral Palsy as the Head of Advocacy and Disability Studies. Ghosh believes in equality of all people. To change society and creating a place for persons with disabilities and other marginalized groups, she feels strongly that there needs to be a change in perspective the way these groups are viewed and understood.

References

Year of birth missing (living people)
Living people
People with cerebral palsy
Social workers
Activists from Delhi
Women educators from Delhi
Educators from Delhi
Social workers from Delhi
Indian disability rights activists
Indian people with disabilities
Presidency University, Kolkata alumni